Taquaral is a municipality in the state of São Paulo in Brazil. The population is 2,819 (2015 est.) in an area of 53.9 km². The elevation is 639 m.

References

Municipalities in São Paulo (state)